St. Mark's Episcopal Cathedral located at 231 E. 100 South in Salt Lake City, Utah is the cathedral church of the Diocese of Utah in the Episcopal Church in the United States of America. Built in 1871, it is the third oldest Episcopal cathedral in the United States and the second oldest continuously used worship building in Utah. It was designed by architect, Richard Upjohn, in the Gothic Revival style. On September 22, 1970, it was added to the National Register of Historic Places.

History
The original cornerstone was laid in 1870 under the supervision of Bishop Daniel Sylvester Tuttle with funding from Episcopalians in New York and Pennsylvania. The cathedral was consecrated on May 14, 1874. A fire in 1935 gutted the sanctuary, but the church was rebuilt following the original design.

The early Episcopal Church left its mark in the community such that by 1880, members of the church had established Saint Mark's School for Boys, Rowland Hall School for Girls, and Saint Mark's Hospital. Rowland Hall / St. Mark's School is now merged and offers education today for K–12.

Today
Current outreach includes Hildegarde's Pantry, Community of Faith Celebrations, Community of Hope, and Feed My Sheep programs. In addition the cathedral is often used for musical events and the cathedral hall has been used for many Civic events over the years.

In 2005 construction began on a new Cathedral Center that opened in early 2007. This space includes the Dean's hall that provides a meeting and dining area for up to 300 people.  There are also offices, meeting and other space that serve the cathedral and community that it reaches out to in many ways.

See also

 List of the Episcopal cathedrals of the United States
 List of cathedrals in the United States
 List of the oldest churches in the United States
 Rowland Hall-St. Mark's School

References

External links

 
  Diocese of Utah
 

19th-century Episcopal church buildings
Cathedrals in Utah
Churches completed in 1871
Churches in Salt Lake City
Churches on the National Register of Historic Places in Utah
Mark Salt Lake City
Episcopal churches in Utah
Gothic Revival church buildings in Utah
Historic American Buildings Survey in Utah
National Register of Historic Places in Salt Lake City
Richard Upjohn church buildings